Kuchmachi is a traditional Georgian dish of chicken livers, hearts and gizzards with walnuts and pomegranate seeds for topping.

References

Cuisine of Georgia (country)
Liver (food)
Pomegranates